Rail transport in Mongolia is an important means of travel in the landlocked country of Mongolia, which has relatively few paved roads.  According to official statistics, rail transport carried 93% of Mongolian freight and 43% of passenger turnover in 2007. The Mongolian rail system employs 12,500 people. The national operator is UBTZ (Ulaanbataar Railway), traditionally also known as Mongolian Railway (MTZ). This can be a source of confusion, since MTZ is a distinct company established in 2008. The Mongolian Railway College is located in Ulaanbaatar.

Routes

The Trans-Mongolian Railway connects the Trans-Siberian Railway from Ulan Ude in Russia to Erenhot and Beijing in China through the capital Ulaanbaatar. The Trans-Mongolian Railway runs through Mongolia on  Russian gauge track, changing to standard gauge track after entering China. There are several spur lines: to the copper combine in Erdenet, to coal mines in Sharyngol, Nalaikh and Baganuur, to the fluorspar mine in Bor-Öndör and to the former Soviet military base in Züünbayan.

A separate railway line exists in the east of the country between Choibalsan and the Trans-Siberian at Borzya; however, that line is closed to passengers beyond the Mongolian town of Chuluunkhoroot. This line used to have a spur line to the uranium mine at Mardai, however this spur line was torn up and sold in the late 1990s/ early 2000s.

For domestic transport, daily trains run from Ulaanbaatar to Darkhan, Sukhbaatar, and Erdenet, as well as Zamyn-Üüd, Choir and Sainshand.
The Mongolian Railway (MongolRail) is slated to cover  by year 2025. Mongolian railways transported 20.5 million tons of freight in 2013, which is close to the system's full capacity. 
Transporting transit cargo between Russia and China is an important source of revenue for the country's railway system; in addition to this, railways are used to transport domestic coal to power plants.

Proposals 
 Standard gauge:
 Ukhaa Khudag (part of the Tavan Tolgoi coal field) - Oyu Tolgoi (copper/gold mine) - Gashuun Sukhait (Chinese border): ca. 260 km   A special vote of the Mongolian Parliament made it possible to construct this railway on the 1435 mm standard gauge (for a seamless connection with China's railway network), rather than on the 1520 mm Russian gauge used elsewhere in Mongolia.

 Nariin Sukhait (coal mine) - Shiveekhüren (Chinese border): ca. 45 km

  Baotou
  Mongolia
  Ukhaa Khudag - coal mine

 Broad gauge:
 Tavan Tolgoi - Oyu Tolgoi - Sainshand - Choibalsan: ca. 1100 km

Rolling stock

As Mongolia's railroads are not electrified, UBTZ relies entirely on Diesel traction. Most common locomotives are M62 variants, including five rebuilt 2Zagal (two white horses) double engines. Other engines include TEM2 and TE116 variants, Dash-7 and one Evolution locomotive on lease from GE. In October 2010, Ulaanbaatar Railway ordered 35 2TE116UM diesel freight locomotives from Transmash.

Maps 
 UN Map
 UNHCR Map

See also 
 Transport in Mongolia

References

External links
  Official site Railway Authority of Mongolia